was a town located in Tokoro District, Abashiri Subprefecture (now Okhotsk Subprefecture), Hokkaido, Japan.

Since March 5, 2006 Rubeshibe, along with the towns of Tanno and Tokoro (all from Tokoro District), was merged into the expanded city of Kitami.

In December 2005, the town had an estimated population of 8,704 and a density of 15.41 persons per km2. The total area was 564.69 km2.

Climate

References

External links
Kitami city website 

Dissolved municipalities of Hokkaido
Kitami, Hokkaido